Clinton Township is a second-class township in Wayne County, Pennsylvania, United States. The township's population was 2,053 at the time of the 2010 United States Census.

Geography

Communities
The following villages are located in Clinton Township:
Aldenville
Browndale (also called Forest City Station)
Creamton

Demographics

As of the census of 2010, there were 2,053 people, 851 households, and 567 families residing in the township.  The population density was 53.7 people per square mile (20.7/km2).  There were 1,185 housing units at an average density of 30.2/sq mi (11.8/km2).  The racial makeup of the township was 98.5% White, 0.2% African American, 0.05% Native American, 0.2% Asian, 0.1% from other races, and 0.8% from two or more races. Hispanic or Latino of any race were 0.9% of the population.

There were 851 households, out of which 25.7% had children under the age of 18 living with them, 55% were married couples living together, 8.2% had a female householder with no husband present, and 33.4% were non-families. 28.9% of all households were made up of individuals, and 12.5% had someone living alone who was 65 years of age or older.  The average household size was 2.41 and the average family size was 2.97.

In the township the population was spread out, with 20.8% under the age of 18, 61.6% from 18 to 64, and 17.6% who were 65 years of age or older.  The median age was 44.9 years.

The median income for a household in the township was $34,811, and the median income for a family was $42,782. Males had a median income of $29,896 versus $20,341 for females. The per capita income for the township was $15,363.  About 6.0% of families and 9.6% of the population were below the poverty line, including 10.0% of those under age 18 and 13.2% of those age 65 or over.

Education
Residents of the township are served by Forest City Regional School District and Western Wayne School District.

References

Townships in Wayne County, Pennsylvania